Howard Roberts (April 8, 1843 – April 19, 1900) was an American sculptor based in Philadelphia, Pennsylvania. At the time of the 1876 Centennial Exposition, he was "considered the most accomplished American sculptor." But his output was small, his reputation was soon surpassed by Augustus Saint-Gaudens and others, and he is now all but forgotten. Examples of his work are in the collections of the Pennsylvania Academy of the Fine Arts, the Philadelphia Museum of Art, and the U.S. Capitol.

Biography
Born into a well-to-do Philadelphia family, Roberts studied at the Pennsylvania Academy of the Fine Arts under sculptor Joseph A. Bailly. He was an exact contemporary of fellow Philadelphian Thomas Eakins, and both entered the École nationale supérieure des Beaux-Arts in Paris in 1866, and studied under sculptor Augustin-Alexandre Dumont. Eakins did not consider Roberts a friend, calling him "a rich disagreeable young man from Philadelphia, one who has without any apparent reason seen fit to be my enemy." Still, Eakins may have sketched him, and Roberts brokered a reconciliation between Eakins and Mary Cassatt. Roberts continued his studies under sculptor Charles Gumery, before returning to Philadelphia in 1869.

Architect Frank Furness, whose firm won the 1871 design competition for PAFA's new building, sought advice from the two wonder boys from Paris, Roberts and Eakins, when designing its painting and sculpture studios.

Roberts's first major work was a two-thirds-life-size marble statue of Hester Prynne (1869–72), the heroine of Nathaniel Hawthorne's novel The Scarlet Letter, which was exhibited at the Pennsylvania Academy of the Fine Arts in 1872. He returned to Paris in 1873, taking with him his life-size plaster model of Hypathia (heroine of Charles Kingsley's novel of the same name) to be cut in marble. In addition, he began a new work, completing in marble La Premiere Pose (1873–76), and brought it back to Philadelphia to be exhibited at the 1876 Centennial Exposition. He was awarded a gold medal for the statue. As the critic William J. Clark described it: In the United States Department there was no piece of sculpture which was marked by such high technical qualities as the Premiere Pose of Howard Roberts. ... The subject is a young woman preparing to pose undraped, for the first time, in a painter's studio, and the sculptor has indicated his own appreciation of the fact that the situation has both a comic and a tragic side, by the grotesque comic and tragic masks which he has added as decorations to the uprights of the back of the chair. ... The workmanship, however, is so fine throughout that it would be an almost endless task to attempt a detailed analysis of it.

Roberts helped to turn American tastes away from Italianate Neo-Classicism to French Beaux-Arts realism. He was the unanimous choice in an 1877-78 national design competition for a statue to represent Pennsylvania in the U.S. Capitol. Rather than creating a heroic formal work, he modeled a young Robert Fulton dressed in casual clothes, deep in thought, contemplating the possibilities of the steamboat model he holds in his lap:
—A statue of Robert Fulton has been finished in the clay by Howard Roberts. Fulton is dressed as a working man, and is intent on a small model held in the right hand, the forearm being bare. About his chair are tools. The model has been accepted by the Legislature.
This exactly paralleled what Thomas Eakins was doing in his paintings of William Rush and His Model — portraying the artistic/intellectual process of the sculptor/inventor, rather than celebrating the finished work. The Fulton statue was installed in Statuary Hall in 1883.

Roberts carved numerous portrait busts and statuettes, but no other major sculptures are known. He closed his Philadelphia studio in 1894, and returned to Paris, where he died in 1900. A memorial exhibition of his work was held at the Pennsylvania Academy of the Fine Arts in 1905.
Howard Roberts (1845-1900) exhibited a figure called La Première Pose at the Centennial Exposition in 1876, which aroused great interest, as it was the first notable example of the modern French style in American sculpture. A few ideal busts and statues or statuettes, Hester Prynne, Hypathia, Lot's Wife, Eleanor, make up the sum of Roberts' works, but he has the honor of having introduced the French style.

Personal
On June 1, 1876, he married Helen Pauline Davis Lewis (1853–1938). They had two children: Howard Radclyffe Roberts (1877–1924),  and who was the father of Howard Radclyffe Roberts Jr.; and Helen Pauline Roberts (1880–1889), who died young.

Selected works

Bust of Eleanore (1870), marble, Pennsylvania Academy of the Fine Arts, Philadelphia, Pennsylvania.
Hester Prynne and Baby Pearl at the Pillory (1869–72), marble, Library Company of Philadelphia.
Hypathia Attacked by the Monks (1873–77), marble, Pennsylvania Academy of the Fine Arts, Philadelphia, Pennsylvania.
La Premiere Pose (1873–76), marble, Philadelphia Museum of Art.
Lot's Wife (1876–77), marble, private collection.
(Statuette?) of Napoleon's First Battle (1878–79), location unknown.
Robert Fulton (1878–83), marble, National Statuary Hall, U.S. Capitol, Washington, D.C.

References

David Sellin, "The First Pose: Howard Roberts, Thomas Eakins and a Century of Philadelphia Nudes", Bulletin of the Philadelphia Museum of Art, 70:311-12 (Spring 1975). .
Joe Rischl, "Howard Roberts (1843-1900)", Philadelphia: Three Centuries of American Art (Philadelphia Museum of Art, 1976), pp. 394–96.
Susan James-Gadzinski and Mary Mullen Cunningham, "Howard Roberts, 1843-1900", American Sculpture in the Museum of American Art of the Pennsylvania Academy of the Fine Arts (PAFA, 1997), pp. 86–89.

External links

Artists from Philadelphia
Sculptors from Pennsylvania
19th-century American sculptors
19th-century American male artists
American male sculptors
Pennsylvania Academy of the Fine Arts alumni
American alumni of the École des Beaux-Arts
1843 births
1900 deaths
Pont-Aven painters